Exodeconus is a genus of flowering plants belonging to the family Solanaceae.

Its native range is Western and Southern South America.

Species:

Exodeconus flavus 
Exodeconus integrifolius 
Exodeconus maritimus 
Exodeconus miersii 
Exodeconus prostratus 
Exodeconus pusillus

References

Solanaceae
Solanaceae genera
Flora of South America